The Arhopalini are a rather small tribe of butterflies in the family Lycaenidae.

Genera

As not all Theclinae have been assigned to tribes, the following list of genera is preliminary:

 Apporasa
 Arhopala
 Flos
 Keraunogramma
 Mahathala
 Mota
 Ogyris
 Semanga
 Surendra
 Thaduka
 Zinaspa

References 

 
Theclinae
Butterfly tribes